The Wayson stain is a basic fuchsin-methylene blue, ethyl alcohol-phenol microscopic staining procedure. It was originally a modified methylene blue stain used for diagnosing bubonic plague.  With this stain, Yersinia pestis appears purple with a characteristic safety-pin appearance, which is due to the presence of a central vacuole.

Wayson stain is used along with the Giemsa and Wright's stains to rapidly detect potential biowarfare attacks. It has also been investigated as a possible cheaper and faster way to detect melioidosis. It is a useful alternative to the Gram or Loeffler's Methylene Blue stains, especially for detecting Yersinia enterocolitica which is often found in contaminated food.

References

External links
Lab Safety sheet for Wayson Stain

Staining dyes
Bacteriology